Ernst Bollmann (12 February 1899 in Duisburg – 1974 in Moers) was a German politician. He was a member of the Nazi Party (NSDAP).

References

Nazi Party politicians

1899 births
1974 deaths